The Maracanã River is a river of the state of Pará, Brazil.

Course

It rises in the south of the municipality of Castanhal, Pará, then flows in a northeast direction to the Atlantic Ocean at  Maracanã, Pará.
The river is lowest between September and October and highest between February and April.
Its main tributary is the Caripi River, which enters the Maracanã from the left.

The Chocoaré - Mato Grosso Extractive Reserve protects part of the right (east) shore of the Maracanã River.
The lower reaches of the Maracanã River, before it empties into the Atlantic Ocean beside Maiandeua Island, are protected by the  Maracanã Marine Extractive Reserve, created in 2002.
The municipality and town of Maracanã are at the mouth of the river.

Environment

The vegetation around the Maracanã River is mostly savanna.
The area around the river has a relatively small population, with 38 people per square kilometre.  
Temperatures average .
Annual rainfall averages .

See also
List of rivers of Pará

References

Sources

Rivers of Pará